Richard Burton Marlowe (June 27, 1929 – December 30, 1968) was an American professional baseball pitcher who appeared in 98 games in Major League Baseball for the Detroit Tigers and Chicago White Sox from 1951 to 1956. He attended Davidson College.

Davidson's professional career lasted from 1948 through 1957. In 1952, Marlowe, while pitching for the Triple-A Buffalo Bisons, became the second player in International League history to throw a perfect game. In September 1956, he was claimed off waivers by the White Sox, but worked in only one game for them, his last MLB appearance on September 30.

In his 98-game big-league career, Marlowe compiled a 13–15 won–lost record with three saves and a 4.99 earned run average, allowing 280 hits and 101 bases on balls—with 108 strikeouts—in 243 innings pitched. In 17 starting assignments, he threw three complete games and no shutouts.

Marlowe died from cancer in Toledo, Ohio, on December 30, 1968.

References

External links

1929 births
1968 deaths
Baseball players from North Carolina
Buffalo Bisons (minor league) players
Charleston Senators players
Chicago White Sox players
Davidson Wildcats baseball players
Deaths from cancer in Ohio
Detroit Tigers players
Flint Arrows players
Major League Baseball pitchers
People from Hickory, North Carolina
Portland Beavers players
Toledo Mud Hens players
Vancouver Mounties players
Williamsport Tigers players